Antone Cornelius (Tony) Van Vliet (born January 11, 1930) was an American politician who was a member of the Oregon House of Representatives.

He was born in San Francisco, California and attended Oregon State University, earning a bachelor of science degree in forestry and masters of science degree in wood science. He later attended Michigan State University, earning a Ph.D. in forest products in 1970. He then worked as a professor at Oregon State's forestry department from 1995 to 1990. At Oregon State, he also was associate director, and later director of the Career Planning and Placement Center

References

External links
Tony Van Vliet Oral History Interview

1930 births
Living people
Republican Party members of the Oregon House of Representatives
Politicians from San Francisco
Oregon State University alumni
Oregon State University faculty
Michigan State University alumni
Politicians from Corvallis, Oregon